Al-Tall, Al Tall, at-Tall, et-Tell etc. may refer to:

 Al-Tall, Acre, depopulated village formerly in northwestern Palestine 
 Al-Tall District, a district of Syria
 Al-Tall, Syria, the capital city of that district
 Et-Tell, West Bank, an archaeological site
 Et-Tell, presumed capital of Geshur, presumed site of Bethsaida Julias; immediately northeast of the Sea of Galilee
 
People named Al-Tall, Al Tall or variants:

 Abdullah el-Tell (1918–1973), Transjordanian officer, governor of Jerusalem, royal adviser
 Siraj Al Tall (born 1982), Jordanian footballer
 Wasfi al-Tal (1919–1971), former prime minister of Jordan
 Mustafa Wahbi Al Tal, (1897–1949), Jordanian poet

Other uses:
 Al Tall (band), Spanish folk music band